Le Soleil ("The Sun") is the name of several newspapers:

 Le Soleil (Quebec), a French-language daily newspaper in Quebec City, Quebec, Canada, founded in 1896
 Le Soleil (French newspaper), a defunct daily newspaper based in Paris from 1873 to 1915
 Le Soleil (Senegal), a daily newspaper published in Dakar, Senegal, founded in 1970
 Le Soleil de la Floride, a newspaper in Florida for Francophones and tourists.

See also
 Droit dans le soleil, French musical duo
 Sous le soleil, French soap opera channel
 Sun (newspaper), refers to several different newspapers from around the world.